National Route 131 is a national highway of Japan connecting Haneda Airport and Ōmori-Higashi 2-chōme, Ōta, Tokyo in Japan, with a total length of 3.6 km (2.24 mi).

References

131
Haneda Airport